The Lewisville Leopards are an American professional basketball team based out of Lewisville, Texas, and a member of The Basketball League (TBL).

History
On August 18, 2019, Evelyn Magley, CEO of The Basketball League (TBL), announced a new franchise called the Lewisville Yellow Jackets sponsored and owned by Creating Young Minds located in Lewisville, Texas. Creating Young Minds also operates CYM Academy, a high school and amateur team. The team was renamed the Lewisville Leopards following their inaugural pandemic-shortened season.

Current roster

References

Basketball teams established in 2019
2019 establishments in Texas
Basketball in the Dallas–Fort Worth metroplex
Former The Basketball League teams
Lewisville, Texas